Mohammad Khaja Nazeeruddin (born 1957 in Thumboor, Andhra Pradesh, India) is an Indian-Swiss chemist and materials scientist specialized in Perovskite solar cells, dye-sensitized solar cells, and light-emitting diodes. He is a professor at EPFL (École Polytechnique Fédérale de Lausanne) and the director of the Laboratory for Molecular Engineering of Functional Materials at School of Basic Sciences.

Career 
Nazeeruddin was born in 1957 and brought up in the Indian village of Thumboor. In 1985, he received a PhD in chemistry from the Osmania University in Hyderabad, India. For the following two years he was a lecturer at Osmania University. In 1986, he joined the Central Salt and Marine Chemicals Research Institute in Bhavnagar, India. In 1987 he joined EPFL first as a postdoctoral fellow and then held several positions as research fellow. In 2012, he was made "Maître d’ Enseignement et de Recherche" (senior lecturer). Since 2014 he has been a full professor at EPFL (École Polytechnique Fédérale de Lausanne) and head of the Laboratory for Molecular Engineering of Functional Materials at School of Basic Sciences based at EPFL's Valais campus.

He has a track record teaching and performing research at international universities as World Class University Professor (2009–2014) and as BKPLUS 21 (2014-2019) at the Department of Advanced Materials, Chemistry of the Korea University, and as Visiting Professor at King Abdulaziz University in Jeddah, Saudi Arabia (2014 - 2021) and at the North China Electric Power University (2014 - 2021), and as an eminent professor at Brunei.

Research 
Nazeeruddin's research focuses on chemical engineering of functional materials for photovoltaic and light-emitting applications such as Perovskite and dye-sensitized solar cells, and light-emitting diodes.

His research team contribute to the field of inorganic chemistry for renewable energy is molecular engineering of ruthenium sensitizers that convert solar energy through the use of high surface area nanocrystalline mesoscopic films of oxide semiconductors. These tailored-sensitizers have initiated a new direction in dye-sensitized solar cell research. They synthesized several ruthenium sensitizers (N3, N719 and N749), and the donor-π-bridge-acceptor porphyrin sensitizers that showed over 13% power conversion efficiency. They also developed near IR sensitizers with selective functionalization of donor-acceptor groups producing 7.0% power conversion efficiency. The development of such zinc phthalocyanine sensitizers enable windows that transmit part of the visible light and harvest in the red and near-IR section of the spectrum. Furthermore, they have also engineered cobalt complexes as redox mediators that deliver very high currents and high open-circuit potential reaching 1.06 V.

A further field of their research encompass organic light-emitting diodes (OLEDs) that are used in the fabrication of digital displays. They contributed novel blue, green, and red phosphorescent iridium emitters for OLEDs. With their OLED research they participated in the EU-FP7 project "all-carbon platforms for highly efficient molecular wire-coupled dye-sensitized solar cells," and received funding from the EU Horizon 2020 program for their SOLEDLIGHT project.

He has established a new laboratory at EPFL-Sion Energy center, focusing on organic, inorganic lead halide perovskite solar cells and Light Emitting Diodes research. He explored the effects of the energy level, mobility, and morphology of the charge transport layers and the triple-cation mixed perovskite (formamidinium, methylammonium, and cesium) used in blue, green, and infrared LEDs. By varying the composition of the halides, spectrally narrow electroluminescence over the entire wavelength is achieved. He fabricated blue, green, and red PLEDs with unprecedentedly high external quantum efficiency. By optimizing the thickness and morphology of the device's constituent layers, the red, green, and blue PLEDs achieved improved electroluminescence (EL) efficiencies at low turn-on voltages. Interestingly, the triple inorganic and organic cations perovskite-based devices exhibited long operational environmental stability, demonstrating that compositionally engineered perovskite is an attractive material for PLEDs and photovoltaic applications.

He has extensively investigated solutions (one-step and sequential deposition) and sublimation-deposited perovskite solar cells and obtained a record-certified power conversion efficiency of 25%. His group has pioneered compositional engineering of perovskite and the design and development of electron and hole-transporting materials. Their striking finding was the non-stoichiometric ratio of PbI2 to methylammonium iodide (an excess of PbI2) that significantly improves perovskite crystal size and efficiency, reproducibility, and modifies the interface between perovskite and electron transporting layer. To further enhance perovskite solar cells' stability, he has developed layer-by-layer growth of 3-dimensional and 2-dimensional perovskites yielding over 24% certified efficiency and stability. His group has developed a Perovskite Solar Cells Module (area 26.02 cm2) with an efficiency of 22.4%, which is a world record and entered in the "Solar cell efficiency tables (Version 61)" by Martin A. Green, Ewan D. Dunlop, Gerald Siefer, Masahiro Yoshita, Nikos Kopidakis, Karsten Bothe and Xiaojing Hao. rog Photovolt Res Appl. 2022;1–14. DOI: 10.1002/pip.3646.

Their research was featured in several international news outlets.

Distinctions 
Nazeeruddin has been the author of more than 825 peer-reviewed papers and several book chapters, and he holds as an inventor over 103 patents. According to Thomson Reuters he has been named a "Highly Cited Researcher" since 2014 in chemistry, materials science and engineering, and, in 2016 and in 2017, one of the 19 scientists considered the "World's Most Influential Scientific Minds" from all scientific domains. As stated in the ISI listing he is one of most cited chemists with more than 126'000 citations and an h-index of 160. His group has earned worldwide recognition and leadership in Perovskite solar cells as evidenced by The Times of Higher Education named him  “the top 10 researchers in the world working on the high impact perovskite materials and devices”. He has been named Thomson Reuter's "Highly Cited Researcher" from 2014 to 2022. Based on the Career Long Impact, Nazeeruddin has been enlisted as one of the Top 2% Most-Cited Scientists in the world from the list published by Stanford University in October 2022. 
He is an elected member of the European Academy of Sciences, and is a fellow of The Royal Society of Chemistry. Fellow of Telangana Academy of Sciences, and Member of the Swiss Chemical Society.  He was awarded the 34th Khwarizmi International Award in Basic Sciences, 2021.

Since 2018 he has been a jury member of the Rei Jaume I foundation in Spain.

He is the recipient of the best paper award from the journal Inorganics, the EPFL Excellence Prize (1998 and 2006), the Brazilian FAPESP fellowship award (1999), the Japanese Government Science & Technology Agency Fellowship (1998), and Government of India National Scholar award (1987-1989).

He is Editor in Chief, Chemistry of Inorganic Materials, an Advisory Board member at Advanced Functional Materials, an Associated Editor at Energy Chem, an Editorial Advisory Board member at Scientific Reports, an Editorial Advisory Board at RRL Solar, and an Editorial Advisory Board member at Artificial Photosynthesis.

Selected works

References

External links 
 
 Publication listed on ORCID
 Publication listed on Publons
 Website of the Laboratory of Molecular Engineering of Functional Materials

1957 births
Living people
Osmania University alumni
Academic staff of the École Polytechnique Fédérale de Lausanne
Solid state chemists
People from Thrissur district
Indian chemists
21st-century Indian chemists
Academic staff of Osmania University
Indian emigrants to Switzerland